The 1997–98 Greek Football Cup was the 56th edition of the Greek Football Cup.

Tournament details

Totally 66 teams participated, 18 from Alpha Ethniki, 18 from Beta, and 30 from Gamma. It was held in 7 rounds, included final. The teams of Alpha Ethniki would enter in the competition in the Third Round.

Panionios made the surprise overcoming Panathinaikos in the Final and won the second Cup in their history, after 1979. Also, they were neophyte in Alpha Ethniki that year, while the previous season they had participated in Beta Ethniki Championship. In semi-finals they eliminated PAOK. Panathinaikos in the Fourth Round eliminated Panserraikos, achieving an impressive victory in Serres, with extraordinary 4–6, and while in half time they were behind in the score, 3–1.

Calendar

Knockout phase
Each tie in the knockout phase, apart from the final, was played over two legs, with each team playing one leg at home. The team that scored more goals on aggregate over the two legs advanced to the next round. If the aggregate score was level, the away goals rule was applied, i.e. the team that scored more goals away from home over the two legs advanced. If away goals were also equal, then extra time was played. The away goals rule was again applied after extra time, i.e. if there were goals scored during extra time and the aggregate score was still level, the visiting team advanced by virtue of more away goals scored. If no goals were scored during extra time, the winners were decided by a penalty shoot-out. In the final, which were played as a single match, if the score was level at the end of normal time, extra time was played, followed by a penalty shoot-out if the score was still level.The mechanism of the draws for each round is as follows:
There are no seedings, and teams from the same group can be drawn against each other.

First round

|}

Second round

||colspan="2" rowspan="4" 

|}

Bracket

Round of 32

|}

Round of 16

|}

Quarter-finals

|}

Semi-finals

|}

Final

The 54th Greek Cup Final was played at the Karaiskakis Stadium.

References

External links
Greek Cup 1997–98 at RSSSF

Greek Football Cup seasons
Greek Cup
Cup